This is an index to deities of the different religions, cultures and mythologies of the world, listed by type of deity.

Motif-index
A basic classification of the types of gods as based on the Motif-Index of Folk-Literature, by Stith Thompson:

A0 Creator (not a god)
A100—A199. The gods in general 
A101. Supreme God
A104. The Making of the Gods
A107. Gods of Darkness and Light (darkness thought of as evil and light as good).
A109.1. Triple deity
A116. Triplet gods
A111.1. Mother of the gods
A111.2. Father of the Gods
A117.5. Gods as spirits of the deified dead
A131. Gods with animal features
A132.3. Equine god / goddess
A132.5. Bear god / goddess
A132.9. Cattle god / goddess
A161.2. King of the Gods
A177.1. Gods as Dupe or Tricksters
A192. Death or departure of the gods
A193. Gods of Dying-and-rising
A200—A299. Gods of the Upper World
A210. Gods of the Sky
A220. Gods of the Sun
A240. Gods of the Moon
A250. Gods of the Stars
A260. Gods of Light
A270. Gods of the Dawn
A280. Gods of the Weather
A281. Gods of Storms
A282. Gods of the Wind
A284. Gods of Thunder 
A287. Gods of Rain
A300—A399. Gods of the Underworld
A310. God of the World of the Dead
A311. Conductor of the Dead
A400—A499. Gods of the Earth (The Human Sphere)
A400. Gods of the Earth
A401. Mother Earth
A405. Gods of Nature
A410. Local Gods
A411. Gods of the Hearth and Household
A415. Gods of Clans or Nations
A420. Gods of Water

A430. Gods of Vegetation
A431. Gods of Fertility
A435. Gods of Trees and Forests
A440. Gods of Animals
A450. Gods of Trades and Professions
A451. Artisan Gods
A452. Gods of Hunting
A454. Gods of Healing
A460. Gods of Abstractions (also Z110. Abstractions personified)
A461. Gods of Wisdom
A463. Gods of Fate
A463.1. the Fates, (goddesses who preside over the fates of men)
A464. Gods of Justice
A465. Gods of the Arts
A472. Gods of Sleep
A473. Gods of Wealth
A475. Gods of Love and Lust
A484. Gods of Oaths
A485. Gods of War
A486. the Furies, (goddesses of vengeance)
A487. Gods of Death
A490. Miscellaneous Gods of the Earth
A491. God of Travellers
A493. Gods of Fire
A500—A599. Demigods and Culture Heroes
A502. Heroes or demigods as fourth race of men. 
A510. Origin of the culture hero (demigod).

A515.1.1. Twin culture heroes.
A521. Culture hero as dupe or trickster.
A531. Culture hero (demigod) overcomes monsters.

Other deities by association 
Gods of Chaos
Gods of Doorways and Thresholds
Gods of the Night
Queen of Heaven
Gods of Smithing
Gods of wine and beer / Goddess
Gods of poppy

Other classifications 
Apotheosis
Deified heroes
Divine Council
God / Goddess
Horned deity
Imperial Cult
Incarnation
Master of Animals / Potnia Theron
Mother Nature
Sacred king
Tutelary deity

Related concepts 
Legendary creature
Hybrid
Human hybrid
Liminal being
Pantheon
Spirit
Angel
Demon / Devil
Demonology / Archdemon
Fairy
Geist
Ghost
Holy Spirit
Soul
Water spirit

Lists 
Demigods
Ghosts
Goddesses
Pantheons
Theological demons
Ars Goetia
Sigils

See also
 Religious cosmology

References

Classification